Ronald Darby (born January 2, 1994) is an American football cornerback who is a free agent. He played college football at Florida State and was drafted by the Buffalo Bills in the second round of the 2015 NFL Draft. He has also played for the Philadelphia Eagles and Washington Commanders. A world-class sprinter during his high school years, Darby won medals at the 2011 World Youth Championships in Athletics.

High school career
Darby attended Potomac High School in Oxon Hill, Maryland, where he played as many as six different positions on offense, defense, and special teams. Excelling on defense, Darby was part of a Wolverines' secondary that also included Tavon Young, and which registered four shutouts and allowed just 82 points in 2011. Darby was a USA Today and Sports Illustrated High School All-American in 2011, and participated in the 2012 Under Armour All-American Game. as a junior, rushed for 1,329 yards and 23 touchdowns, while tallying three interceptions and eight pass breakups on defense.

Regarded as a four-star recruit by Rivals.com, Darby, running a 4.37-second 40-yard dash, was ranked as the No. 2 cornerback prospect in his class, behind only Tracy Howard. He chose Florida State over Notre Dame, Maryland, Clemson and Auburn.

Darby won a bronze medal in the 200 m at the 2011 World Youth Championships in Athletics. He also finished fourth in the 100 m. Along with Aldrich Bailey, Najee Glass, and Arman Hall, he ran a World Youth Best in the meet's medley relay.

His personal bests are 6.77 seconds in the 60 meters, 10.41 seconds in the 100 meters and 21.05 seconds in the 200 meters.

College career
As a true freshman at Florida State, Darby was part of a Florida State defense that led the ACC in points allowed (15.1 per game) and yards allowed (253.8). They ranked seventh in the FBS. Additionally, Darby was a brother of Pi Kappa Alpha fraternity while attending Florida State University. Although exclusively a back-up to Xavier Rhodes and Nick Waisome, Darby registered 18 tackles and broke up seven passes in 2012, which earned him ACC Defensive Rookie of the Year honors. Darby was also named Freshman All-American by the Football Writers Association of America. In the 2013 Orange Bowl vs. Northern Illinois, Darby registered four solo tackles and one defended pass. As a sophomore, he played in 14 games with nine starts, including playing in, and winning the 2013 BCS National Championship game. For the season he had 14 tackles and two interceptions. As a junior in 2014, he started all 14 games and recorded 43 tackles.

After his junior season, Darby entered the 2015 NFL Draft.

Professional career
Coming out of Florida State, Darby was projected to be selected in the second or third rounds by the majority of analysts and scouts. With a deep cornerback draft class, Darby was considered the second-best cornerback coming out of Florida State behind P. J. Williams. He was invited to the NFL Combine and was able to raise his draft stock after finishing with good times in the 40, 20, and 10-yard dash. Darby participated at Florida State's Pro Day, but was satisfied with his combine performance and only performed positional drills. He had scheduled visits with the Tampa Bay Buccaneers, Indianapolis Colts, Carolina Panthers, Tennessee Titans, and New York Jets. Going into the 2015 NFL Draft, he was ranked the third-best cornerback by Lance Zierlein, the sixth-best cornerback by Sports Illustrated, and the seventh-best by NFLDraftScout.com.

Buffalo Bills

2015
The Buffalo Bills selected Darby in the second round (50th overall) of the 2015 NFL Draft. He was the seventh cornerback drafted and one of ten players from Florida State to be selected. On May 19, 2015, Darby signed his four-year rookie contract with the team, worth 4.56 million. After competing with Stephon Gilmore, Corey Graham, Ross Cockrell, Nickell Robey, and Ron Brooks throughout training camp, Darby was named a starting cornerback, opposite Gilmore, to begin the regular season.

Darby made his professional regular-season debut in the Buffalo Bills' season-opener against the Indianapolis Colts, recorded six combined tackles and two pass deflections, and intercepted Andrew Luck for the first pick of his career, as the Bills defeated the Colts, 27–14. On September 27, 2015, he made five combined tackles and a season-high four pass deflections, and intercepted Miami Dolphins' quarterback Ryan Tannehill during a 41–14 victory. He was named the AFC Defensive Rookie of the Month for September. During a Week 9 match-up against the Dolphins, he had a season-high ten solo tackles and deflected a pass in a 33–17 victory. He missed a Week 16 victory over the Dallas Cowboys after suffering a groin injury. Darby finished his rookie season with 68 combined tackles (61 solo), 21 pass deflections, and two interceptions in 15 games and 15 starts, while also being named Pro Football Focus' Defensive Rookie of the Year.

2016
Darby was named the starting cornerback to begin the 2016 regular season. He started the Buffalo Bills' season-opener against the Baltimore Ravens and recorded seven solo tackles and made two pass deflections in a 13–7 loss. He missed the Bills' Week 3 victory over the Arizona Cardinals with a hamstring injury. During a Week 7 contest against the Miami Dolphins, he made a season-high eight solo tackles in a 28–25 loss. On November 27, 2016, Darby left in the first quarter of a game against the Jacksonville Jaguars after suffering a concussion while trying to make a tackle on Jaguars' running back Chris Ivory. Ivory attempted to hurdle him but his knee was driven into Darby's helmet in the process. He missed the 38–24 loss to the Oakland Raiders the following week. On December 11, 2016, he racked up a season-high ten combined tackles during a 27–20 loss to the Pittsburgh Steelers. Darby finished the 2016 season with 69 combined tackles (60 solo) and 12 pass deflections in 14 games and 14 starts. The Buffalo Bills finished with a 7–9 record and head coach Rex Ryan was fired after Week 16 and replaced with Anthony Lynn.

Philadelphia Eagles

2017
On August 11, 2017, the Bills traded Darby to the Philadelphia Eagles for slot wide receiver Jordan Matthews and a third round pick (96th overall) in the 2018 NFL draft. In his first game with the Eagles, Darby injured his ankle in the second quarter and was carted off the field. It was revealed that he dislocated his ankle and was ruled out for 4–6 weeks. He would then make his return in Week 11 against the Dallas Cowboys in which he achieved his first interception as an Eagle. Darby finished his first season as an Eagle with 34 tackles, 3 interceptions, and 9 passes defended. The Eagles reached Super Bowl LII where they defeated the New England Patriots 41–33. Darby had 4 tackles and 2 passes defended in the game.

2018
Darby entered the 2018 season as a starting cornerback for the Eagles. He started the first nine games before suffering a season-ending torn ACL in Week 10. He was placed on injured reserve on November 17, 2018. He finished the season with 43 tackles, 12 passes defended, and one interception.

2019
On March 15, 2019, Darby signed a one-year, $8.5 million contract to remain with the Eagles.
In week 2 against the Atlanta Falcons, Darby recorded his first interception of the season off Matt Ryan in the 24–20 loss.
In week 13 against the Miami Dolphins, Darby intercepted a pass thrown by Ryan Fitzpatrick on the first drive of the game in the 37–31 loss. He was placed on injured reserve on December 24, 2019 with a hip injury. He finished the season with 37 tackles, 11 pass breakups, and two interceptions through 11 starts.

Washington Football Team
Darby signed with the Washington Football Team on April 6, 2020, known at the time as the Redskins. He started all 16 games for Washington in 2020, finishing with 54 tackles and 16 pass deflections.

Denver Broncos

Darby signed a three-year, $30 million contract with the Denver Broncos on March 17, 2021. He was placed on injured reserve on September 14, 2021. He was activated on October 9.

Darby suffered a torn ACL in Week 5 of the 2022 season and was placed on season-ending injured reserve on October 10, 2022.

On March 14, 2023, Darby was released by the Denver Broncos.

References

External links

Denver Broncos bio

DyeStat profile for Ronald Darby

1994 births
Living people
African-American players of American football
American football cornerbacks
American male sprinters
Buffalo Bills players
Denver Broncos players
Florida State Seminoles football players
People from Oxon Hill, Maryland
Philadelphia Eagles players
Players of American football from Maryland
Sportspeople from the Washington metropolitan area
Track and field athletes from Maryland
Washington Football Team players
21st-century African-American sportspeople